National Highway 66, commonly referred to as NH 66 (erstwhile NH-17 and a part of NH-47),  is a mostly 4 lane  long busy National Highway that runs roughly north–south along the western coast of India, parallel to the Western Ghats. It connects Panvel (a city south of Mumbai) to Cape Comorin (Kanyakumari), passing through the states of Maharashtra, Goa, Karnataka, Kerala and Tamil Nadu.

The highway is undergoing a major overhaul in Karnataka, where the state government has accepted the NHAI's request of international standard, 60-metre-wide national highway with grade separators. The complete stretch from the Goa border (near Karwar) to the Kerala border (near Talapady) is being widened to four lanes, with space to accommodate future expansion to six lanes. There were protests from the people, who will lose lands, for a narrower stretch. But the Karnataka government has not heeded to the protests. 
 
Land acquisition and tendering process for national highway widening is happening at brisk pace in Kerala. New bypass works have already been kick-started. Owing to higher density of population and high land value, national highway will be 45 meter width, 6 lane, in Kerala. Goa also will have a similar alignment. Karnataka and Maharashtra sections will have 60-meter width. The Maharashtra section will be converted into a flexible pavement (asphalt) road with four lanes.

The Ministry of Road Transport & Highways, Government of India has proposed a greenfield (i.e., new and parallel) access controlled expressway corridor connecting the port cities of Mangalore-Karwar-Panaji as part of the Indian National Expressway Network. This expressway will be parallel to NH-66 and will be mainly located in coastal Karnataka. It is expected to be a 6/8 lane access-controlled 3D right-of-way designed expressway.

Route description 
It starts at Panvel, at the junction of National Highway 48 (old NH4), and ends at Kanyakumari. NH-66 mainly traverses through the west coast of India, sometimes touching the shores of the Arabian Sea. The NH66 touches the Arabian Sea at Maravanthe in Karnataka, Thalassery and Alappuzha in Kerala. It passes through the Indian states of Maharashtra, Goa, Karnataka, Kerala and Tamil Nadu.

The National Highway 66 (previously numbered NH-17) connects cities, towns and major villages of different states as follows: 
Maharashtra
Panvel, Pen, Mangaon, Mahad, Poladpur, Khed, Chiplun, Sangameshwar, Ratnagiri, Lanja, Rajapur, Kankavli, Kudal, Sawantwadi, 
Goa
Panaji, Margao, 
 
Karnataka
Karwar, Ankola, Kumta, Honnavar, Manki, Murudeshwar, Bhatkal, Shiroor, Baindur, Uppunda, Navunda, Maravanthe, Hemmadi, Tallur, Kundapura, Koteshwar, Kota, Saligrama, Brahmavar, Udupi, Kapu, Padubidri, 
Mulki, Surathkal, Mangaluru, Thokottu, Ullal, Kotekar, Talapady
Kerala
Manjeshwaram, Kasaragod, Kanhangad, Payyannur Pariyaram, Taliparamba, Dharmashala, Chovva, Dharmadam, Thalassery, Mahe, Vatakara, Payyoli, Koyilandi, Kozhikode, Ramanattukara, Tenhipalam, Kottakkal, Puthanathani, Valanchery, Kuttippuram, Thavanur , Ponnani, Chavakkad, Vadanappally, Kodungallur, Edappally, Kochi, Cherthala, Alappuzha, Ambalapuzha, Haripad, Kayamkulam, Karunagappally, Chavara, Neendakara, Kollam, Mevaram, Kottiyam, Chathannoor, Kallambalam, Attingal, Kazhakkoottam, Thiruvananthapuram, Balaramapuram,   Neyyattinkara, Parassala
Tamil Nadu 
Marthandam, Nagercoil and Kanyakumari

Major intersections 
{| class="plainrowheaders wikitable"
|-
!scope=col|State
!scope=col|District
!scope=col|Location
!scope=col|km
!scope=col|mi
!scope=col|Destinations
!scope=col|Notes
|-
|rowspan="4"|Maharashtra
|rowspan="2"|Raigad
|Panvel
|km= 
| 
| Northern end of the highway.
|-
|Vadhkal
|km= 
| 
| 
|-
|rowspan="2"|Ratnagiri
|Chiplun
|km= 
|
|
|-
| Hatkhamba
|km= 
| to Ratnagiri
|
|-
|rowspan="3"|Goa
|rowspan="1"|North Goa
|Panaji
|km= 
| 
| 
|-
|rowspan="2"|South Goa
|Cortalim
|km= 
| to Vasco da Gama
| route to Goa Airport
|-
|Verna
|km= 
| to Vasco da Gama
|route to Goa Airport
|-
|rowspan="4"|Karnataka
|rowspan="2"|Uttar Kannada
|Ankola
|km= 
| to Hubli
| 
|-
|Honnavar
|km= 
|
|
|-
|rowspan="1"|Udupi
|Udupi
|km= 
| 
|
|-
|rowspan="1"|Dakshina Kannada
|Mangalore
|km= 
|
|
|-
|rowspan="8"|Kerala
|rowspan="2"|Kozhikode
|Malaparamba
|km= 
| to Wayanad, Mysore, Kollegal
|-
|Ramanattukara
|km= 
| to Malappuram, Palakkad
|
|-
|rowspan="3"|Ernakulam
|Cheranallur
|km= 
| to Vallarpadam, International Container Transshipment Terminal, Kochi
|
|-
|Edapally
|km= 
| to Salem
|
|-
|Kundannoor
|km= 
| to Munnar   to Willingdon Island, Cochin Port
|Southern Naval Command headquarters - INS Vendruruthy
|-
|rowspan="3"|Kollam
|Chavara
|km= 
| 
|
|-
|Kadavoor
|km= 
| - Anchalumoodu, Kollam
| 
|-
|Kallumthazham
|km= 
| - Punalur, Kollam
| 
|-
|rowspan="2"|Tamil Nadu
|rowspan="2"|Kanyakumari
|Nagercoil
|km= 
| 
|
|-
|Kanyakumari
|km= 
| 
| Southern end of the highway.

Road condition 

The NHAI has received the approval to upgrade the complete stretch of highway, from start to end, to a four-lane highway, which will be  and grade separated. The four-laning of NH-66 (Mumbai-Kanyakumari) has been completed until Thalapadi in the Karnataka-Kerala border and only its stretch in Kerala is pending. In the beginning of 2017, Kerala government has announced the six laning of NH 66 in the state as a major agenda and said to be completed in three years. But the high value of land will make it hard for compensation, and the ruling party's influence is controversial in relation to similar acquisitions like GAIL pipeline. Now the process is going fast in spite of protests from various highway action forum groups, especially because it connects Kerala's capital Thiruvananthapuram to Kochi and of tourism importance. NH 66 has one of the highest vehicle densities in the state compared to sections of the highway in other states, so its development is vital for the overall development of the state, also the HAM model to be followed in widening will be instrumental in collecting the funds for the development. NHAI has been infamous for their heavy and long tenure of toll collection in the state.
Tunnels will be constructed in the stretches where the road goes through the forest or ghat section. As the forest department does not allow land acquisition for road widening purposes, tunnels which can accommodate four-lane expressways are proposed for such stretches of the road in NH-66. One such proposal is the Maharashtra government's proposal of 1.4 kilometre tunnel at the Karnala bird sanctuary.

Currently, the road is comparatively narrow and without dividers for the most part. The lack of dividers has led to an increased incidence of head-on collisions between vehicles. At some places, signboards indicating left or right turns, speed-breakers, etc. are either damaged or missing. In addition to its narrow span, there are no guard railings along the sides of the highway. The sides of the road are at times at a lower level than the road. Due to heavy human settlement around the highway and narrow span, the average speed on this highway is far lesser than what can be attained on comparatively better highways such as NH3, NH4 or NH8. One can find carcasses of animals on the road, indicating the risk of inattentive animals coming into the road. Two-wheel vehicles must take a special note of this. The road surface is uneven at certain stretches, not just in rainy seasons, but even at other times.

At certain places in Karnataka, the surface is so badly damaged that the iron rods underneath are exposed. Presently, the work on widening this highway has been undertaken at certain stretches. Due to narrow span and lack of dividers, there are no separate lanes for oncoming traffic, driving and passing (over-taking). As a result, over-taking is quite rampant. At times, motorists attempt over-taking even on curves where the oncoming traffic cannot be seen. Other motorists are advised to be on the lookout for such oncoming vehicles.

On 19 March 2013 a bus carrying over 50 persons fell off a bridge close to a river in the Khed area of Ratnagiri district. 37 people were killed in the incident.

The highway in the state of Karnataka is being upgraded to a 60-metre-wide grade separated highway, in which vehicles can travel at a speed of 100 km per hour. It is a major overhaul, in which certain bridges are being constructed as six-lane bridges for the smooth movement of traffic. The widening work is going on in the complete stretch from the Goa border to the Kerala border. The stretch between Suratkal (NITK) to Kankanady cross (Mahavir Circle) has been already converted to four lanes. The four-lane stretch between Surathkal and Coondaapur is under progress.

Connectivity 

Prior to the building of National Highway 66 (NH 66), then known as National Highway 17 (NH17), in the 1960s and 1970s, ships and steamers running between Mumbai and Mangalore calling at different ports were the only means of transport along the west coast of India adjoining the Arabian Sea. These ship services were abandoned later. The NH 66 connects the interior parts of the coastal regions with the rest of the country. The NH 66 connects the major sea ports of West India, Mumbai, JNPT at Nhava Sheva, Vizhinjam International Seaport at Trivandrum, Mormugao (MPT), New Mangalore (NMPT), International Container Transshipment Terminal, Kochi, Kollam Kollam Port and Ratnagiri Port and other important ports like Beypore Port and Kollam Port.

Hence this National Highway 66 allows for the movement of goods by trucks (lorries) from the hinterland to the major sea ports of India. Trade and commerce in the region have increased due to the expansion of markets for agricultural products and seafood produced in the region connected by this highway. The formation of NH 66 has led to the development of tourism in the region connected by this highway. Goa state is a classic example of this development. Many industries have been set up along National Highway 66, taking advantage of connectivity and proximity to ports on the Arabian Sea. The highway was the only source of connection between areas in the coastal districts, until the Konkan Railway was opened in 1998, between Mumbai and Mangalore.

One can still find old number NH-17 written on boards of shops and other establishments along NH-66 highway even in the year 2017.

Major cities and places on the highway

Maharashtra state

Goa state

Karnataka state
Uttara Kannada District

 
Dakshina Kannada (Udupi and Mangaluru District)

Kerala state

Tamil Nadu state

Major city/town bypass roads on the highway
 Trivandrum Bypass - Trivandrum city, Kerala
 Kollam Bypass - Kollam city, Kerala
 Alappuzha Bypass - Alappuzha town, Kerala
 Kochi Bypass - Kochi city, Kerala
 Kodungallur Bypass - Kodungallur town, Kerala
 Vadanappally Bypass -Vadanappally, thrissur, under construction 
 Ponnani Bypass-Ponnani, Malappuram District
 Valanchery bypass , Malappuram District- Under Construction
 Kottakkal bypass, Malappuram District- Under Construction
 Kozhikode Bypass , Kerala
 Koyilandy Bypass - Under Construction
 Vadakara Bypass- Kozhikode District- Under Construction
 Thalassery-Mahe Bypass Kannur District, Kerala - Under Construction
 Kannur Bypass -  Under Construction
 Taliparamba Bypass -Kannur DistrictUnder Construction
 Payyannur Bypass -Kannur District Under Construction
Sawantwadi Bypass - Sawantwadi - Banda Section - Maharashtra

Lifestyle along NH 66 
NH 66 passes through hills, forests, rivers, rivulets, and streams, generally flowing westwards towards the Arabian Sea. Most of the region has typical scenes like coconut trees dotted all along with paddy fields and arecanut gardens. The road is uneven, and bumps, curves, steep rises and narrow paths in between hillocks are found all over this highway. As this region experiences heavy rainfall, potholes are abundant.

Although the languages spoken vary along the highway, the food of the people along the NH 66 has some common ingredients like coconut, chili, pepper, coconut oil, and fish. The region has a higher literacy rate than other regions of India. The building of National Highway 66 has led to rapid development of the towns and cities along the highway.

Parallel access controlled expressway 
This highway is expected to lose importance in coastal Karnataka as the Ministry of Road Transport & Highways, Government of India has proposed a greenfield (i.e., new and parallel) access controlled expressway corridor connecting the port cities of Mangaluru, Karwar, and Panaji. This highway-expressway combination can be compared to the Mumbai-Pune Highway-Expressway combination. Two-wheeler, three-wheeler and local traffic will use the four-lane highway (without access control and designed for slower traffic), whereas trucks, buses and four-wheelers will travel at the maximum speed on the access-controlled 3D right-of-way designed 6/8-lane expressway. (The 3D right-of-way concept means adding the space (height) element to the usual length and breadth dimensions involved in road construction.)

Popular culture 
• A road trip along the highway was made popular by the Bollywood films Bombay to Goa and  Dil Chahta Hai.

See also 
 List of National Highways in India (by Highway Number)
 National Highways Development Project
 National Highway 75 (India)
 National Highway 73 (India)
 National Highway 169 (India)
 National Highway 52 (India)
 National Highway 275 (India)
 Konkan Railway Corporation

References

External links 
 

National highways in India
66
66
66
66
66
Transport in Panvel
Transport in Kanyakumari